Michelbach may refer to:


Places in Austria
 Michelbach, Lower Austria

Places in France
 Michelbach-le-Bas, Haut-Rhin
 Michelbach-le-Haut, Haut-Rhin
 Aspach-Michelbach, Haut-Rhin
 Michelbach, Haut-Rhin

Places in Germany
 Michelbach, Saarland, part of the municipality of Schmelz
 Michelbach, Marburg, Hesse
 Michelbach an der Bilz, Baden-Württemberg
 Michelbach, Altenkirchen, Rhineland-Palatinate
 Michelbach, Rhein-Hunsrück, Rhineland-Palatinate
 Wald-Michelbach, Hesse
 Michelbach, a district of Gaggenau, Baden-Württemberg
 Michelbach/Heide, a district of Gerabronn, Baden-Württemberg
 Michelbach, a district of Alzenau, Bavaria
 Michelbach, a district of Aarbergen, Hesse

Rivers in Germany
 Michelbach (Bessenbach), Bavaria, tributary of the Bessenbach
 Michelbach (Nidda), Hesse, tributary of the Nidda
 Michelbach (Gersprenz), Hesse, tributary of the Gersprenz
 Michelbach (Usa), Hesse, tributary of the Usa